"Where the Blacktop Ends" is a song written by Allen Shamblin and Steve Wariner and recorded by Australian country music singer Keith Urban. It was released in April 2001 as the fourth and final single from Urban's first American self-titled album. The song became the Urban's third (consecutive) Top 5 hit on the US Billboard Hot Country Singles and Tracks chart after reaching number 3.

Chart positions
"Where the Blacktop Ends" debuted at number 55 on the U.S. Billboard Hot Country Singles & Tracks for the week of April 14, 2001.

Year-end charts

References

2001 singles
Keith Urban songs
Songs written by Steve Wariner
Music videos directed by Peter Zavadil
Songs written by Allen Shamblin
Capitol Records Nashville singles
1999 songs